Francesco Merano (1619–1657) was an Italian painter of the Baroque period, mainly active in Genoa, where he was born.  He was one of the pupils of the Genoese Domenico Fiasella.  Merano was also known as il Paggio. He married the niece of the painter Giovanni Andrea de' Ferrari.

Sources

1619 births
1657 deaths
17th-century Italian painters
Italian male painters
Painters from Genoa
Italian Baroque painters